The Troy Bruins were an International Hockey League team based in Troy, Ohio that played from 1951 to 1959 at the Hobart Arena.  Notable players were Brian Kilrea and Larry King Kwong. Goaltender Bill Tibbs won the James Norris Memorial Trophy IHL for the fewest goals against during the 1955–1956 regular season.

The Bruins were relocated by owner Ken Wilson in 1959, and admitted to the Eastern Hockey League, to play as the Greensboro Generals in the recently built Greensboro Coliseum.

For the 2008-2009 season, the ECHL's Dayton Bombers wore special Troy Bruins throwback jerseys while playing six games at Hobart Arena, before auctioning them off for charity.

References

External links
A to Z Encyclopaedia of Ice Hockey
Hockey D B Troy Bruins Yearly Stats

International Hockey League (1945–2001) teams
Miami County, Ohio
Defunct ice hockey teams in Ohio
Ice hockey clubs established in 1951
Sports clubs disestablished in 1959
1951 establishments in Ohio
1959 disestablishments in Ohio